Hill-Marta Solberg (born 12 November 1951, in Sortland) is a Norwegian politician for the Labour Party.  During her career, she was a parliamentary representative for Nordland county from 1993-2009.  She was the Minister of Health and Social Affairs for three years and then was the  County Governor of Nordland county for nearly ten years.  She retired on 15 November 2018.

Personal life
Hill-Marta Solberg was born on 12 November 1951 in Sortland in Nordland county, Norway to Arne J. Hansen and Borghild Jensen.

Education and career
Solberg took her Examen artium in 1970.  She then went to the Trondheim teacher's school and got her degree in 1974.  She began her teaching career in Mo i Rana during the 1975-1976 school year.  She then moved to Harstad to teach the next year, and then she moved to Sortland to teach from 1977-1987. From 1983-1987, she served on the municipal council of Sortland Municipality.  She resigned from teaching in 1987 to run for mayor of Sortland Municipality, a position that she won.  She served as mayor from 1988 until 1993.

During her political career, she rose to the position of Deputy Leader of the Labour Party and held that position from 1992 until 1997.

Solberg was elected to represent Nordland county in the Parliament of Norway in 1993.  She served four consecutive terms in Parliament until 2009.  During her time in Parliament, she served in the cabinets of Prime Ministers Gro Harlem Brundtland and Thorbjørn Jagland as the Minister of Health and Social Affairs from 1 January 1994 until 17 October 1997.

As she was serving in her final term in Parliament, the Cabinet of Norway named her to the position of County Governor of Nordland county in 2007.  Since she was still serving in Parliament at that time, Ola Bjerkaas served as the acting governor from 2007 until the end of her parliamentary term in 2009 when she assumed the governorship.  She served as governor until her retirement on 15 November 2018.

From 2009-2018, she was the chair of the board for Vinmonopolet, the Norwegian government alcoholic beverage retailer.

External links

1951 births
Living people
County governors of Nordland
County governors of Norway
People from Sortland
Mayors of places in Nordland
Labour Party (Norway) politicians
Women mayors of places in Norway
Members of the Storting
Government ministers of Norway
20th-century Norwegian women politicians
21st-century Norwegian politicians
21st-century Norwegian women politicians
20th-century Norwegian politicians
Women government ministers of Norway
Women members of the Storting